The Gauja (in Lithuanian; , Hawya; , Gav’ya) is a river in southern Lithuania and western Belarus, a right tributary of the Neman.

Rivers of Lithuania
Rivers of Belarus